Lee Sze Ming (born 5 February 1979 in Hong Kong) is a Hong Kong former professional footballer. He played a variety of positions (all attacking positions), mostly as a forward and right wing. 

Lee also played for the Hong Kong futsal team.

Honours
South China
Hong Kong Senior Shield: 1998–99

Happy Valley
Hong Kong First Division: 2005–06

Eastern 
Hong Kong Senior Shield: 2007–08

Career statistics

Club career
As of 23 February 2008

International career
As of 24 February 2008

Notes and references

External links
Lee Sze Ming at HKFA
About Lee Sze Ming 

1979 births
Living people
Hong Kong footballers
Hong Kong international footballers
Association football midfielders
Hong Kong First Division League players
South China AA players
Eastern Sports Club footballers
Hong Kong Rangers FC players
Happy Valley AA players
Sun Hei SC players
Double Flower FA players
Expatriate footballers in Macau
G.D. Lam Pak players